Flat Shoals is a small unincorporated community in Stokes County, North Carolina, United States, approximately four miles southwest of county seat Danbury, near Hanging Rock State Park.

Unincorporated communities in Stokes County, North Carolina
Unincorporated communities in North Carolina